This article lists the archbishops of Uppsala.

Before the Reformation

 1164–1185: Stefan
 1185–1187: Johannes
 1187–1197: Petrus
 1198–1206: Olov Lambatunga
 1207–1219: Valerius
 1219 (1224)–1234: Olov Basatömer
 1236–1255: Jarler
 1255–1267: Lars
 1274–1277: Folke Johansson Ängel
 1278–1281: Jakob Israelsson
 1281–1284: Johan Odulfsson (not ordained)
 1285–1289: Magnus Bosson
 1289–1291: Johan
 1292–1305: Nils Allesson
 1308–1314: Nils Kettilsson
 1315–1332: Olov Björnsson
 1332–1341: Petrus Filipsson
 1341–1351: Heming Nilsson
 1351–1366: Petrus Torkilsson
 1366–1383: Birger Gregersson
 1383–1408: Henrik Karlsson
 1408–1421: Jöns Gerekesson (Johannes Gerechini)
 1421–1432: Johan Håkansson
 1432–1438: Olov Larsson (Olaus Laurentii)
 1433–1434: Arnold of Bergen (not ordained)
 1438–1448: Nicolaus Ragvaldi
 1448–1467: Jöns Bengtsson Oxenstierna
 1468–1469: Tord Pedersson (Bonde) (not ordained)
 1469–1515: Jakob Ulvsson
 1515–1517: Gustav Trolle 
 1520–1521: Gustav Trolle (under Danish government)
 1523–1544: Johannes Magnus (in exile after 1526)
 1544–1557: Olaus Magnus (in exile)

During and after the Reformation

 1531–1573: Laurentius Petri (Nericius)
 1575–1579: Laurentius Petri Gothus
 1583–1591: Andreas Laurentii Björnram
 1593–1599: Abraham Angermannus
 1599–1600: Nicolaus Olai Bothniensis (not ordained)
 1601–1609: Olaus Martini (Olof Mårtensson)
 1609–1636: Petrus Kenicius
 1637–1646: Laurentius Paulinus Gothus
 1647–1669: Johannes Canuti Lenaeus
 1670–1676: Lars Stigzelius
 1677–1681: Johan Baazius the younger
 1681–1700: Olov Svebilius (Olaus Svebilius)
 1700–1709: Erik Benzelius the elder
 1711–1714: Haquin Spegel
 1714–1730: Mathias Steuchius
 1730–1742: Johannes Steuchius (Johannes Steuch)
 1742–1743: Erik Benzelius the younger
 1744–1747: Jakob Benzelius
 1747–1758: Henric Benzelius
 1758–1764: Samuel Troilius
 1764–1775: Magnus Beronius
 1775–1786: Carl Fredrik Mennander
 1786–1803: Uno von Troil
 1805–1819: Jacob Axelsson Lindblom
 1819–1836: Carl von Rosenstein
 1837–1839: Johan Olof Wallin
 1839–1851: Carl Fredrik af Wingård
 1852–1855: Hans Olov Holmström
 1856–1870: Henrik Reuterdahl
 1870–1900: Anton Niklas Sundberg
 1900–1913: Johan August Ekman
 1914–1931: Nathan Söderblom
 1931–1950: Erling Eidem
 1950–1958: Yngve Brilioth
 1958–1967: Gunnar Hultgren
 1967–1972: Ruben Josefson
 1972–1983: Olof Sundby
 1983–1993: Bertil Werkström
 1993–1997: Gunnar Weman
 1997–2006: Karl Gustav Hammar
 2006–2014: Anders Wejryd
 2014–present: Antje Jackelén

See also
Archbishop of Uppsala
Church of Sweden

External links
The Church of Sweden: Official list of Archbishops of Uppsala

Uppsala
Archbishops of Uppsala